Northern Pride is the biggest LGBT Pride festival in the North East of England, hosted in Newcastle upon Tyne.  It is held in July every year on the Town Moor, just outside the City Centre. The event is free for all who attend and offers music, stalls and a safe space for LGBT+ people, their families and friends. Northern Pride is a celebration of LGBT+ culture, history and societal diversity.

Northern Pride presents Newcastle Pride each year which is a 3-day festival on Newcastle Town Moor and in Times Square in the Centre for Life. Along with the Main Stage the festival offers a Family Zone, Youth Zone, Trans Zone, Women's Zone, Steve Paske Health Zone, Cabaret Tent, Sports Zone. Bear Zone, Dance Tent, Market Stalls and Fair ground. In the run up to the Pride weekend Northern Pride holds a number of satellite events and just after the Pride weekend they hold the ever-popular Paws with Pride pet show.

History 
Building on the previous work of the organisation 'Pride On Tyne', the Northern Pride committee converted to a not for profit limited company in January 2009, having successfully hosted a Pride event in July 2008.

Since conception, the event has grown over the two years - with approximately 4,000 people in attendance in 2008 and 6,000 attending in 2009. Northern Pride presents Newcastle Pride 2013 had 28,000 visit it for the 1 day festival. 2014 saw Newcastle Pride triple in size and become a 3-day festival over 2 sites while still remaining a free festival attracting 65,000 visitors.

Headliners for the 2015 event were Belinda Carlisle and B*Witched with Lucy Spraggan, Kitty Brucknell and Heather Peace also appearing on the bill.

The 2016 event included performances from Lorraine Crosby, Jordan Gray, Hazell Dean, Heather Peace, Tina Cousins, Jake Quickenden, Five, Sonia and Heather Small.

Funding 
The event attracts sponsorship from private organizations and local authorities. Northern Pride has built excellent relationships with trade unions who support the event.

Management 
The committee is made up of volunteers, (re)elected at annual general meetings by the organisation's membership.
The current committee are:

References

External links 
 Northern Pride

LGBT events in England
Culture in Newcastle upon Tyne
Tourist attractions in Newcastle upon Tyne
LGBT festivals in the United Kingdom